Mount Rigny (Rignys Bjerg) is a mountain peak in East Greenland. It is located in King Christian IX Land, Sermersooq Municipality.

The mountain was named by Jules de Blosseville, after French naval officer Marie Henri Daniel Gauthier, comte de Rigny (1782–1835).

Geography
Mount Rigny is the highest peak in a mountainous area east of the Sortebrae Glacier close to the Blosseville Coast. Reaching , Rigny Bjerg was marked on Jules de Blosseville's map of 1833 which also contained a drawing of the mountain's profile as seen from the sea. The mountain was then identified by the 1895-96 Ingolf Expedition led by C.F. Wandel, and its approximate position determined by the 1898–1900 Carlsbergfund Expedition to East Greenland led by G.C. Amdrup. This mountain's elevation and position are incorrect in the Defense Mapping Agency Greenland Navigation charts.

In Rigny Berg there are routes popular with mountaineers, such as "Snow Falcon", as well as neighboring peaks in the region such as RHARPeak. The first successful ascent in 1998 by Russ Hore and Al Read. 

The first full ascent of Rigny Bjerg was made on 19 July 2003 by the 'Midnight Sun 03 Expedition'.

Certain studies claim that the mountain corresponds to the legendary Norsemen's Blåsærk and to the Mount of Gods Mercie named by Henry Hudson in 1607.

See also
List of mountains in Greenland

References

External links
"Snow Falcon" Gr III Rignys Bjerg
Rockclimbing - Russ on RHARPeak
Rigny Bjerg - RHARPeak  
Mountains of Greenland
Exploration of the Arctic
Polar exploration